Fort Union National Monument is a unit of the National Park Service of the United States, and is located north of Watrous in Mora County, New Mexico.  The national monument was founded on June 28, 1954.

The site preserves the second of three forts constructed on the site beginning in 1851, as well as the ruins of the third.  Also visible is a network of ruts from the Mountain and Cimarron Branches of the old Santa Fe Trail.

There is a visitor center with exhibits about the fort and a film about the Santa Fe Trail.  The altitude of the Visitor Center is 6760 feet (2060 m).  A 1.2-mile (1.9-kilometre) trail winds through the fort's adobe ruins.

Description by William Davis 
Santa Fe trader and author William Davis gave his first impression of the fort in the year 1857:

Fort Union, a hundred and ten miles from Santa Fé, is situated in the pleasant valley of the Moro. It is an open post, without either stockades or breastworks of any kind, and, barring the officers and soldiers who are seen about, it has much more the appearance of a quiet frontier village than that of a military station. It is laid out with broad and straight streets crossing each other at right angles. The huts are built of pine logs, obtained from the neighboring mountains, and the quarters of both officers and men wore a neat and comfortable appearance.

History of the fort 

The fort was established in the New Mexico Territory, on the Santa Fe Trail.  It was provisioned in large part by farmers and ranchers of what is now Mora County (formally created in 1860), including the town of Mora, where the grist mill established by Ceran St. Vrain in 1855 produced most of the flour used at the fort.

The fort served as the headquarters of the 8th Cavalry in the early 1870s and as the headquarters of the  9th Cavalry in the late 1870s during the Apache Wars.

F. Stanley wrote and published a book titled Fort Union New Mexico in 1953, giving a colorful history of this fort and individuals such as Davey Crockett.

Land ownership
In its forty years (1851–1891) as a frontier post, Fort Union had to defend itself in the courtroom as well as on the battlefield. When the United States Army built Fort Union in the Mora Valley in 1851, the soldiers were unaware that they had encroached on private property, which was part of the Mora Grant. The following year Colonel Edwin Vose Sumner expanded the fort to an area of eight square miles by claiming the site as a military reservation. In 1868, President Andrew Johnson declared a timber reservation, encompassing the entire range of the Turkey Mountains (part of the Sangre de Cristo range) and comprising an area of fifty-three square miles, as part of the fort.

The claimants of the Mora Grant immediately challenged the government squatters and took the case to court. By the mid-1850s, the case reached Congress. In the next two decades, the government did not give any favorable decision to the claimants, until 1876 when the Surveyor-General of New Mexico reported that Fort Union was "no doubt" located in the Mora Grant. But the army was unwilling to move to another place or to compensate the claimants because of the cost. The Secretary of War took "a prudential measure", protesting the decision of the acting commissioner of the General Land Office. He argued that the military had improved the area and should not give it up without compensation. This stalling tactic worked; the army stayed at the fort until its demise in 1891, not paying a single penny to legitimate owners.

Gallery

See also

National Register of Historic Places listings in Mora County, New Mexico
List of national monuments of the United States

References

External links 

 
 Santa Fe Trail Research Site
 American Southwest, a National Park Service Discover Our Shared Heritage Travel Itinerary

National Park Service National Monuments in New Mexico
Union
Museums in Mora County, New Mexico
Military and war museums in New Mexico
New Mexico Territory
Closed installations of the United States Army
History of Mora County, New Mexico
1851 establishments in New Mexico Territory
1890s disestablishments in New Mexico Territory
Union
Protected areas of Mora County, New Mexico
Protected areas established in 1954
1954 establishments in New Mexico
National Register of Historic Places in Mora County, New Mexico
Santa Fe Trail